TOP Team is the youth wing of TOP 09. TOP Team has existed since 2011. It was founded as an independent organisation to help TOP 09 during elections. It became party's official organisation in 2017.

Footnotes

External links
  Young Conservatives Official Website

Politics of the Czech Republic
Youth politics
2011 establishments in the Czech Republic
Youth wings of political parties in the Czech Republic
TOP 09
Youth wings of conservative parties
Youth wings of liberal parties